Lophophelma albapex is a moth of the family Geometridae first described by Hiroshi Inoue in 1988. It is found on Sulawesi.

References

Moths described in 1988
Pseudoterpnini